The prime minister of Trinidad and Tobago is the head of the executive branch of government in Trinidad and Tobago.

The incumbent prime minister of Trinidad and Tobago is Keith Rowley who won the 2015 general election and was sworn in on 9 September 2015 by President Anthony Carmona as the seventh prime minister of Trinidad and Tobago.

This is a list of the prime ministers of the Republic of Trinidad and Tobago, from the establishment of the office of Chief Minister in 1950 to the present day:

Chief ministers of Trinidad and Tobago

Premier of Trinidad and Tobago

Prime ministers of Trinidad and Tobago

Graphical timeline

See also
Politics of Trinidad and Tobago
List of governors of Trinidad and Tobago
President of Trinidad and Tobago
List of heads of state of Trinidad and Tobago
Leader of the Opposition (Trinidad and Tobago)
Lists of office-holders

Notes

References

External links
 World Statesmen – Trinidad and Tobago
 Rulers.org – Trinidad and Tobago

Trinidad and Tobago, Prime Ministers
 
Prime Minister
1962 establishments in Trinidad and Tobago